UKMA may refer to:

 UK Metric Association
 United Kingdom Minifootball Association
 National University of Kyiv-Mohyla Academy